Vladislav Nosenko (born 22 July 1969) is an Azerbaijani former professional football midfielder.

Club career
Nosenko started his career with Chiatura in 1990 and then he moved to Chiatura. In 1991 he moved to Baku  then in Chiatura and in Neftçi. In 1992 he moved to Ukraine on the side of Kryvbas Kryvyi Rih, Torpedo Zaporizhzhia, Viktor Zaporizhzhia and Zirka Kropyvnytskyi. In 1999 he played for Torpedo Zaporizhzhia and Zirka-2 Kirovohrad. In 200 he played for Zirka Kropyvnytskyi and Dinaburg. In 2002 he moved to Desna Chernihiv the main club in the city of Chernihiv where he played 22 matches and scored 1 goal. He also played 1 match for Zorya Luhansk and 9 matches for Bolat.

International career
Nosenko earned seven caps for the Azerbaijan national team between 1995 and 1997.

References

External links
 
 
Profile on website 
Profile on website 
 
 

1969 births
Living people
FC Desna Chernihiv players
FC Baku players
Neftçi PFK players
FC Kryvbas Kryvyi Rih players
FC Torpedo Zaporizhzhia players
FC Viktor Zaporizhzhia players
FC Zirka Kropyvnytskyi players
FC Zirka-2 Kirovohrad players
Dinaburg FC players
FC Zorya Luhansk players
FC Bolat players
Ukrainian Premier League players
Ukrainian First League players 
Ukrainian Second League players 
Ukrainian Amateur Football Championship players 
Azerbaijani footballers 
Azerbaijani expatriate footballers
Expatriate footballers in Kazakhstan
Expatriate footballers in Latvia
Expatriate footballers in Ukraine
Azerbaijani expatriate sportspeople in Kazakhstan
Azerbaijani expatriate sportspeople in Latvia
Azerbaijani expatriate sportspeople in Ukraine
Association football defenders
Azerbaijan international footballers